Maria Matilda Brooks (1837 – November 16, 1913) was a British-born American painter.

Biography
Brooks was born in 1837 in Staines, England. She studied art in London at the South Kensington Art School and the Royal Academy Schools. She briefly lived in Canada, in Montreal and Quebec City, before moving to New York.

Brooks exhibited her work in the rotunda and the Board Room of the Woman's Building at the 1893 World's Columbian Exposition in Chicago, Illinois.

She died in New York on November 16, 1913 after being struck by an automobile.

References

External links

1837 births
1913 deaths
American women painters
19th-century American women artists
19th-century American painters